Golias may refer to:

Ronald Golias (1929–2005), Brazilian comedian and actor
Vasilis Golias (born 1985), Greek football player
Golias, the legendary instigator of the Goliards during the Middle Ages
Apocalypse of Golias, a satirical 12th-century Latin poem